Honest is a black comedy crime film released in 2000. The film was the directorial debut of ex-Eurythmics member Dave Stewart and starred Peter Facinelli and three members of the British/Canadian girl group All Saints: Melanie Blatt and sisters Nicole and Natalie Appleton.

Honest has been called one of the worst films of all time.

Plot
The plot follows the antics of three gun-toting, streetwise, saucy sisters in Swinging London in the late 1960s. The film is most notable for the topless scenes by the Appleton sisters. Blatt and the Appletons also contributed to three songs on the film's soundtrack.

Reception
Honest received unfavourable reviews with one critic remarking, "It is the worst kind of rubbish, the kind that makes you angry you have wasted 105 minutes of your life." Peter Bradshaw noted Honest "subscribes to the usual credulous fictions about the charm, glamour and wit of violent criminals, and leaves out these qualities in spades" and added "However silly and implausible, it would be all right if there was the slightest hint of brio or fun in the script, written by comedy giants Dick Clement and Ian La Frenais. But there isn't". The Scottish Daily Record went so far as to state that "This turgid tale of Sixties London isn't just bad - it's quite probably the worst film ever" and added "And Honest is being tipped for a slot in Hollywood's hall of shame, ranked alongside duffs like Waterworld and The Avengers". However, the Sunday Times gave it 4 stars and called it a "cult classic" à la Amazon Women on the Moon. The film was screened out of competition at the 2000 Cannes Film Festival.

The low budget (£3 million) film flopped in its opening week in the UK, earning only £111,309 on 220 screens.

British film historian I.Q. Hunter, discussing the issue of "What is the worst British film ever made?", listed Honest as one of the candidates for that title.

Cast
 Nicole Appleton - Gerry Chase
 Natalie Appleton - Mandy Chase
 Melanie Blatt - Jo Chase
 Derek Deadman - Night Watchman
 Graham Fletcher-Cook - Market Trader
 Vinny Reed - Stills Photographer
 Naima Belkhiati - Body Painted Girl
 Peter Facinelli - Daniel Wheaton
 Rick Warden - Baz
 Jonathan Cake - Andrew Pryce-Stevens
 Willie Ross - Woodbine
 Annette Badland - Rose
 Corin Redgrave - Duggie Ord
 Matt Bardock - Cedric

References

External links
 
 

2000 films
2000 black comedy films
2000s crime comedy films
2000s heist films
All Saints (group)
British black comedy films
British crime comedy films
British heist films
British independent films
Films directed by David A. Stewart
Films set in the 1960s
Films shot in Oxfordshire
Films shot in London
Films set in London
Films with screenplays by Dick Clement
Films with screenplays by Ian La Frenais
2000 directorial debut films
2000 comedy films
2000 independent films
2000s English-language films
2000s British films